Heimburg is a village and a former municipality in the district of Harz, in Saxony-Anhalt, Germany. Since 1 January 2010, it is part of the town Blankenburg am Harz.

On a hilltop above the village are the ruins of the old Heimburg Castle which, today, is a good viewing point. Heimburg also lies at the foot of the Ziegenberge, a chain of small hills that have been designated as a nature reserve and run as far as Benzingerode. There are good views from the crest over the Harz Foreland.

Former municipalities in Saxony-Anhalt
Blankenburg (Harz)
Villages in the Harz
Duchy of Brunswick